XHVB-FM is a radio station on 97.3 FM in Villahermosa, Tabasco, Mexico.

History
XHVB received its concession on October 9, 1979. It was owned by Eduardo León del Río and was known as Super Stereo. It was sold to its current concessionaire in 2000 and rebranded as Extremo.

On January 1, 2020, Radio Núcleo handed over operation of its three Villahermosa stations to Grupo Radio Comunicación, with resulting format and name changes for all three. XHVB adopted a romantic format as "Inolvidable". After nine months, Radio Núcleo resumed direct operations; while a return to their prior formats was announced for the other two stations, XHVB-FM was instead announced to be picking up the Radiópolis "Vox Love Station" romantic format.

References

Radio stations in Tabasco